Albert Battel (21 January 1891 – 1952) was a German Army lieutenant and lawyer recognized for his resistance during World War II to the Nazi plans for the 1942 liquidation of the Przemyśl Jewish ghetto. He was posthumously recognized as Righteous Among the Nations in 1981.

Early life 
Battel was born in Klein-Pramsen (Prężynka), next to Neustadt (Prudnik), Prussian Silesia in 1891. After serving in the Imperial  German Army in World War I, he studied economics and jurisprudence at the University of Munich and Breslau (Wrocław). He then worked as a lawyer in the interwar years. In the 1930s, he joined the Nazi Party.

World War II
In 1942, Battel was a 51-year-old reserve officer with the rank of Lieutenant stationed in Przemyśl in southern Poland. He was the adjutant to the local military commander, Major Max Liedtke. When the SS prepared to launch their first large-scale  “resettlement” (liquidation) action against the Jews of Przemyśl on 26 July 1942, Battel, in concert with his superior, ordered the bridge over the River San, the only access into the Jewish ghetto, to be blocked. As the SS commando attempted to cross to the other side, the sergeant-major in charge of the bridge threatened to open fire unless they withdrew. All this happened in broad daylight, to the amazement of the local inhabitants. 

Still later that same afternoon, an army detachment under the command of Oberleutnant Battel broke into the cordoned-off area of the ghetto and used army trucks to evacuate approximately 100 Jews and their families to the barracks of the local military command. These Jews were placed under the protection of the Wehrmacht and were thus sheltered from deportation to Belzec. All the remaining ghetto inmates, including the head of the Judenrat, Dr. Duldig, were sent to the gas chambers in the next few days.

SS investigation
After this incident, the SS authorities began a secret investigation into the conduct of the army officer who had dared defy them under such embarrassing circumstances. It turned out that Battel, though himself a member of the Nazi Party since May 1933, had already attracted notice in the past by his friendly behavior toward the Jews. Before the war, he had been indicted before a party tribunal for having extended a loan to a Jewish colleague. Later, in the course of his service in Przemyśl, he was officially reprimanded for cordially shaking the hand of the chairman of the Jewish Council, Duldig. 

The entire affair reached the attention of the highest level of the Nazi hierarchy. Heinrich Himmler, the Reichsführer-SS, took an interest in the results of the investigation and sent a copy of the incriminating documentation to Martin Bormann, chief of the Party Chancellery and Adolf Hitler's right-hand man. In the accompanying letter, Himmler vowed to have the lawyer expelled from the Nazi Party and arrested immediately after the war.

All this remained unknown to Battel. In 1944, he was discharged from military service because of heart disease. He returned to his hometown Breslau, only to be drafted into the Volkssturm and fall into Soviet captivity. Battel was released in 1946.

Post-war
After his release, Battel settled in West Germany but was prevented from returning to practice law by a denazification court. He instead got a job working in a glass factory.

Death
Battel died in 1952 in Hattersheim am Main, near Frankfurt. He was 61 years old.

Recognition and honor 
Battel’s stand against the SS came to be recognised only a while after his death; most notably, through the tenacious efforts of the Israeli researcher and lawyer Dr. Zeev Goshen.

On 22 January 1981, almost 30 years after his death, Yad Vashem recognised Albert Battel as Righteous Among the Nations.

References

External links
 Auschwitz: The Nazis and the 'Final Solution'
 Righteous Among the Nations (Start: 37:31; Length 10:57)
 Albert Battel – his activity to save Jews' lives at the Holocaust, at Yad Vashem website

1891 births
20th-century German lawyers
German Army personnel of World War I
German Army personnel of World War II
People from the Province of Silesia
German Righteous Among the Nations
Ludwig Maximilian University of Munich alumni
University of Breslau alumni
1952 deaths
Volkssturm personnel
German prisoners of war in World War II held by the Soviet Union
Nazi-era German officials who resisted the Holocaust
People from Prudnik County